North Tayside was a county constituency represented in the House of Commons of the Parliament of the United Kingdom from 1983 until 2005. It elected one Member of Parliament (MP) by the first-past-the-post voting system.

The constituency was abolished for the 2005 general election, and the area is now represented by Angus and Perth and North Perthshire.

The Scottish Parliament constituency of North Tayside, which covered the same area, was in existence from 1999 to 2011.

Boundaries
1983–1997: The Angus District electoral divisions of Forfar East and Dunnichen, Forfar West and Strathmore, Kirriemuir, and Western Glens, and the Perth and Kinross District electoral divisions of Atholl, Breadalbane and Rannoch; St Martin's; Strathardle; Strathisla; and Strathtay.

1997–2005: The Angus District electoral divisions of Brechin and Eastern Glens, Forfar East, Forfar West, and Kirriemuir and Western Glens, and the Perth and Kinross District electoral divisions of Alyth and Coupar Angus; Blairgowrie and Glenshee; Dunkeld and Strathtay; Pitlochry, Aberfeldy and Rannoch; and Scone and St Martin's.

Members of Parliament

Election results

Elections of the 1980s

Elections of the 1990s

Elections of the 2000s

References 

Historic parliamentary constituencies in Scotland (Westminster)
Constituencies of the Parliament of the United Kingdom established in 1983
Constituencies of the Parliament of the United Kingdom disestablished in 2005